The Aberdeen Micropolitan Statistical Area, as defined by the United States Census Bureau, is an area consisting of two counties in South Dakota, anchored by the city of Aberdeen. As of the 2010 census, the μSA had a population of 40,602 (though a July 1, 2017 estimate placed the population at 43,097).

Counties

Brown
Edmunds

Communities
Places with more than 27,500 inhabitants
Aberdeen (Principal city)

Places with 600 to 1,600 inhabitants
Groton
Ipswich

Places with 300 to 600 inhabitants
Bowdle
Roscoe
Warner

Places with 100 to 300 inhabitants
Claremont
Columbia
 Frederick
Hecla
 Hosmer
Westport

Places with less than 100 inhabitants
Stratford
Verdon

Unincorporated places
Barnard
Bath
Beebe
Craven
Ferney
Gretna
Houghton
Huffton
James
Loyalton
Mansfield
Mina
Ordway
Powell
Randolph
Richmond

Demographics
As of the census of 2010, there were 40,602 people, 16,493 households, and 9,853 families residing within the μSA. The racial makeup of the μSA was 93.7% White, 0.5% African American, 2.8% Native American, 0.9% Asian, 0.1% Pacific Islander, 0.4% from other races, and 1.7% from two or more races. Hispanic or Latino of any race were 1.4% of the population.

The median income for a household in the μSA was $48,639, and the median income for a family was $63,069. Males had a median income of $39,358 versus $31,007 for females. The per capita income for the μSA was $25,640.

See also
South Dakota census statistical areas

References

 
Geography of Brown County, South Dakota
Edmunds County, South Dakota